Pál Bakó (born 8 June 1946) is a Hungarian former modern pentathlete. He competed at the 1972 Summer Olympics winning a silver medal in the team event.

References

1946 births
Living people
Hungarian male modern pentathletes
Olympic modern pentathletes of Hungary
Modern pentathletes at the 1972 Summer Olympics
Olympic silver medalists for Hungary
Olympic medalists in modern pentathlon
Sportspeople from Budapest
Medalists at the 1972 Summer Olympics
20th-century Hungarian people
21st-century Hungarian people